Jack R. Arthurs (July 10, 1922 – December 28, 2020) was an American politician who served as a member of the Pennsylvania House of Representatives from 1971 to 1978 as a member of the Democratic Party. Arthurs was born in Brookville, Pennsylvania. Arthurs served in the United States Navy. He worked in public relations for the telephone company. He died in December 2020 at the age of 98.

References

1922 births
2020 deaths
People from Brookville, Pennsylvania
Military personnel from Pennsylvania
Businesspeople from Pennsylvania
Democratic Party members of the Pennsylvania House of Representatives
United States Navy personnel of World War II